Miraclathurella darwini is an extinct species of sea snail, a marine gastropod mollusk in the family Pseudomelatomidae, the turrids and allies.

Description
The length of the shell is 22 mm.

Distribution
Fossils of this species were found in Miocene strata in Chile.

References

 Philippi, Rodolfo Amando. Die tertiären und quartären Versteinerungen Chiles. FA Brockhaus, 1887 p. 266
 Shuto,T. (1992): Affinity of the Late Miocene turrid fauna of Chile . Reports of Andean Studies, Shizuhoka University, Special Vol. 4 p. 21-31
 Nielsen,S.N. (2003): Die marinen Gastropoden (exklusive Heterostropha) aus dem Miozän von Zentralchile. p. 229

External links
 Taxonconcept: Miraclathurella darwini

darwini
Gastropods described in 1887